Graphisurus despectus is a species of longhorn beetles of the subfamily Lamiinae. It was described by John Lawrence LeConte in 1850, and is known from the eastern United States.

References

Beetles described in 1850
Acanthocinini